William Barber (born 29 July 1797) was an English first-class cricketer, active from 1826 to 1828. He was mainly associated with Sheffield Cricket Club and made five known appearances in first-class matches.

References

1797 births
Year of death missing
English cricketers
English cricketers of 1826 to 1863
Sheffield Cricket Club cricketers